The 1973 Missouri Tigers football team was an American football team that represented the University of Missouri in the Big Eight Conference (Big 8) during the 1973 NCAA Division I football season. The team compiled an 8–4 record (3–4 against Big 8 opponents), finished in fifth place in the Big 8, and outscored opponents by a combined total of 219 to 152. Al Onofrio was the head coach for the third of seven seasons. The team played its home games at Faurot Field in Columbia, Missouri.

The team's statistical leaders included Tommy Reamon with 610 rushing yards, John Cherry with 743 passing yards and 895 yards of total offense, Mark Miller with 256 receiving yards, and Greg Hill with 63 points scored.

Schedule

References

Missouri
Missouri Tigers football seasons
Sun Bowl champion seasons
Missouri Tigers football